In aeronautics, the rate of climb (RoC) is an aircraft's vertical speed, that is the positive or negative rate of altitude change with respect to time. In most ICAO member countries, even in otherwise metric countries, this is usually expressed in feet per minute (ft/min); elsewhere, it is commonly expressed in metres per second (m/s). The RoC in an aircraft is indicated with a vertical speed indicator (VSI) or instantaneous vertical speed indicator (IVSI).

The temporal rate of decrease in altitude is referred to as the rate of descent (RoD) or sink rate. 
A negative rate of climb corresponds to a positive rate of descent: RoD = −RoC.

Speed and rate of climb 

There are a number of designated airspeeds relating to optimum rates of ascent, the two most important of these are VX and VY.

VX is the indicated forward airspeed for best angle of climb. This is the speed at which an aircraft gains the most altitude in a given horizontal , typically used to avoid a collision with an object a short distance away. By contrast, VY is the indicated airspeed for best rate of climb,
a rate which allows the aircraft to climb to a specified altitude in the minimum amount of  regardless of the horizontal distance required. Except at the aircraft's ceiling, where they are equal, VX is always lower than VY.

Climbing at VX allows pilots to maximize altitude gain per horizontal distance. This occurs at the speed for which the difference between thrust and drag is the greatest (maximum excess thrust). In a jet airplane, this is approximately minimum drag speed, occurring at the bottom of the drag vs. speed curve.

Climbing at VY allows pilots to maximize altitude gain per time. This occurs at the speed where the difference between engine power and the power required to overcome the aircraft's drag is greatest (maximum excess power).

Vx increases with altitude and VY decreases with altitude until they converge at the airplane's absolute ceiling, the altitude above which the airplane cannot climb in steady flight.

The Cessna 172 is a four-seat aircraft. At maximum weight it has a VY of  indicated airspeed providing a rate of climb of 721 ft/min (3.66 m/s).

Rate of climb at maximum power for a small aircraft is typically specified in its normal operating procedures but for large jet airliners it is usually mentioned in emergency operating procedures.

Variometer

See also
 ICAO recommendations on use of the International System of Units
 Climb (aeronautics)
 Descent (aeronautics)
 V speeds

References

Aerospace engineering
Climb